Newtown is an area of Stockton-on-Tees within the borough of Stockton-on-Tees, County Durham, England. It is next to the Stockton town centre's north-west.

See also
Fairfield
Roseworth

Newtown, Stockton-on-Tees